The Babuyan Claro gecko (Gekko crombota) is a species of gecko. It is endemic to Babuyan Island in the Philippines.

References

Gekko
Reptiles described in 2008
Reptiles of the Philippines
Endemic fauna of the Philippines